Vajin Armstrong (born Luke Armstrong; 12 May 1980) is an ultra-distance runner from Christchurch, New Zealand. Armstrong is a disciple of Sri Chinmoy. He and his wife Prasasta manage a musical instrument shop.

Races and results 
2010–2012 Kepler Challenge, 1st
2012 American River 1st 
2013 Swiss Alpine Marathon, 2nd 
2013 Zugspitz Ultra Trail, 2nd 
2014 Bedrock50 Ultra, 1st 
2014 Buffalo Stampede Marathon, 1st 
2015 Two Bays 56 km Trail Run, 1st 
2016 Swiss Alpine Marathon, Davos, 1st

References

External links 
Video : Ultra-Runner Vajin Armstrong, srichinmoy.tv, 21 August 2016
Video : Vajin Armstrong Pre-2014 Tarawera Ultramarathon Interview, iRunFarMedia, 13 March 2014
Video : Interview with NZ runner Vajin Armstrong, srichinmoy.tv, 15 May 2012

1980 births
Living people
New Zealand male long-distance runners
New Zealand ultramarathon runners
Devotees of Sri Chinmoy
Male ultramarathon runners